Evolution is the seventh studio album by American recording artist Anastacia. The album was released on September 15, 2017 through Four Eyez Productions, Polydor Records and Universal Music Group. This marks Anastacia's first album of original material in three years since Resurrection (2014). It is a pop rock album with dance elements. The album was preceded by the release of one single—"Caught in the Middle".

Background and promotion
The album was recorded and produced by Anders Bagge and recorded in Stockholm, while still on tour during the summer of 2016 throughout the year. Regarding the album title, Anastacia said: "At first I wanted to title this album Stamina, but the word sounded too clinical. When I wrote it, I realized I was stronger than I thought. I would like to awaken strength and courage in my listeners too." Universal Music Group describes the album as pure energy with bursting rock numbers, catchy pop songs and touching ballads. Anastacia performed in Austria on September 1, 2017 on "Starnacht in Der Wachau" and Nürburgring in Germany on September 10, 2017 to promote the album. From September 10 to 14, Anastacia did several interviews in radio stations, such as Bayern 1, RTL Radio Center, Hamburg Zwei and Hamburg Journal. In Germany, Anastacia will present her new album on German talk show Riverboat on September 29, 2017.

Critical reception

The Guardian rated the album a 3 out of 5 stars with a mixed review of the album "Evolution, her seventh album, is unlikely to propel her back into similar levels of stardom, but it once again provides a welcome alternative to the current pop status quo – a slightly nauseating sound that mixes nursery rhyme chants with loud, abrasive production. Managing to feel anthemic in a gentler and more pleasingly melodic way, its songwriting proves as robust as Anastacia’s still inimitable pipes, genre-hopping between rock, dance and slower, musical-style numbers with dexterity and warmth."

Singles
The lead single "Caught in the Middle" was written by Anders Bagge, Lauren Dyson, Javier Gonzalez & Ninos Hanna and was released on iTunes and Spotify on July 28, 2017. The song had some technical issues with its release in the UK, therefore it was only released 3 days later. The video for the single was released one week later on August 4, 2017 on VEVO, and just like it happened to Spotify, the video was only made available in the UK three days later and had over 250.000 views in that first week.

Track listing

Charts

Release history

References

2017 albums
Anastacia albums